Wilbert James Scott is a former American football linebacker who played one season with the Pittsburgh Steelers of the National Football League. Scott was drafted in the 1961 NFL Draft in the 215th pick of the 16th round. He played college football at Indiana University for the Indiana Hoosiers football team.

References

1939 births
Living people
Players of American football from Pennsylvania
American football linebackers
Pittsburgh Steelers players
Indiana Hoosiers football players